Buffalo mozzarella is a mozzarella made from the milk of Italian Mediterranean buffalo. It is a dairy product traditionally manufactured in Campania, especially in the provinces of Caserta and Salerno.

The term mozzarella derives from the procedure called mozzare which means "cutting by hand", separating from the curd, and serving in individual pieces, that is, the process of separation of the curd into small balls. It is appreciated for its versatility and elastic texture and often called "the queen of the Mediterranean cuisine", "white gold" or "the pearl of the table".

The buffalo mozzarella sold as mozzarella di bufala campana has been granted the status of denominazione di origine controllata (DOC – "controlled designation of origin") since 1993. Since 1996 it is also registered as an EU and UK protected designation of origin (Italian: DOP) product. The protected origin appellation requires that it may only be produced with a traditional recipe in select locations in the regions of Campania, Lazio, Puglia, and Molise.

Areas of production

In Italy, the cheese is produced nationwide using Italian buffalo milk under the government's official name mozzarella di latte di bufala because Italian buffalo are found in all Italian regions. Only the specific type mozzarella di bufala campana PDO is produced in the area reaching from Rome in Lazio to Paestum near Salerno in Campania, and there are also production areas in the province of Foggia, in Puglia, and in Venafro, Molise. Buffalo mozzarella is a €300m ($330m) per year industry in Italy, which produces around 33,000 tonnes of it every year, with 16 percent sold abroad (mostly in the European Union). France and Germany are the main importers, but sales to Japan and Russia are growing.

Apart from in Italy, its birthplace, buffalo mozzarella is manufactured in many other countries around the world. There are producers in Switzerland, the United States, Australia, Mexico, Brazil, Canada, China, Japan, Venezuela, Argentina, the United Kingdom, Ireland, Spain, Sweden, Colombia, Thailand, Israel, Egypt, India and South Africa, all using milk from their own herds of water buffaloes.

Mozzarella di bufala campana
Buffalo mozzarella from Campania bears the trademark "mozzarella di bufala campana". In 1993, it was granted denominazione di origine controllata (DOC) status, and in 1996, the trademark received the registry number 1107/96 and in 2008 the European Union granted protected geographical status and the DOP designation. The Consorzio per la Tutela del Formaggio di Bufala Campana ("Consortium for the Protection of the Buffalo Cheese of Campania") is an organization of approximately 200 producers that, under Italian law, is responsible for the "protection, surveillance, promotion and marketing" of Mozzarella di Bufala Campana. The mozzarella industry in Italy resulted from 34,990 recorded females of the Italian Mediterranean breed, which account for ≈30% of the total dairy buffalo population (this percentage does not exist in any other country) and have a mean production of 2,356 kg milk in 270 days of lactation, with 8% fat and 4.63% protein.

History in Italy
The history of water buffalo in Italy is not settled. One theory is that Asian water buffalo were brought to Italy by Goths during the migrations of the early medieval period. The  also refers to fossil evidence (the prehistoric European Water Buffalo, Bubalus murrensis) suggesting that water buffalo may have originated in Italy. A fourth theory is that water buffalo were brought from Mesopotamia into the Near East by Arabs and then introduced into Europe by pilgrims and returning crusaders.

"In ancient times, the buffalo was a familiar sight in the countryside, since it was widely used as a draught animal in ploughing compact and watery terrains, both because of its strength and the size of its hooves, which do not sink too deeply into moist soils."

References to cheese products made from water buffalo milk appeared for the first time at the beginning of the twelfth century. Buffalo mozzarella became widespread throughout the south of Italy from the second half of the eighteenth century, before which it had been produced only in small quantities.

Production in and around Naples was briefly interrupted during World War II, when retreating German troops slaughtered the area's water buffalo herds, and recommenced a few years after the armistice was signed.

2008 dioxin scare
On March 21, 2008, The New York Times published an article which reported the difficulties encountered by the Campania producers of mozzarella in avoiding the contamination of dioxins of dairy products, especially in the Caserta area, and managing the resulting crisis in local sales. The article, later referenced by blogs and other publications, referred to the Naples waste management issue and referred to other pieces published by the International Herald Tribune and various other national and international newspapers.

These articles marked the beginning of an international media attention that raised the threshold of collective attention on the potential harmfulness of buffalo mozzarella from Campania. In particular, they pointed out to varying degrees a relationship between the fires of garbage heaps and the release of dioxins and other cancerous substances, which would end up in the pastures of dairy animals. Alarmed by some positive findings in the dioxin test, the South Korean government was among the first to prohibit the importation of Italian buffalo mozzarella, promising to remove the ban only when the findings confirmed the possible contamination and identification of responsible producers.

A chain reaction followed, in which several countries including Japan, China, Russia and Germany took various measures ranging from the mere raising of the attention threshold to the suspension of imports. The Italian institutions activated almost immediately, even in response to pressing requests from the European Union, a series of checks and suspended, in some cases, the sale of dairy products from the incriminated provinces. Tests had shown levels of dioxins higher than normal in at least 14% of samples taken in the provinces of Naples, Caserta and Avellino. In the provinces of Salerno and Benevento, no control indicated dioxins positivity.

In any case, the contamination has affected, in a limited defined manner, the farms used to produce buffalo mozzarella DOP. On 19 April, China definitively removed the ban on mozzarella, originally activated on 28 March 2008, and tests held in December 2013 in Germany on behalf of four Italian consumer associations have highlighted dioxin and heavy metal levels at least five times lower than the legal limit.

Production stages
To produce  of cheese, a cheese maker requires  of cow milk but only  of buffalo milk. Producing 1 kg of butter requires  of cow milk but only  of buffalo milk.

The steps required to produce buffalo mozzarella are:
Milk storage (raw buffalo milk stored in steel containers).
Milk heating (thermic treatment to the liquid, then poured into a cream separator).
Curdling (by introduction of natural whey).
Curd maturation (the curd lies in tubs to reduce the acidifying processes and reach a pH value of about 4.95).
Spinning (hot water is poured on the curd to soften it, obtaining pasta filata).
Shaping (with special rotating shaper machines).
Cooling (by immersion in cold water).
Pickling (by immersion in pickling tubs containing the original whey).
Packaging (in special films cut as bags or in small basins and plastic).

Nutrition
The digestive system of water buffaloes permits them to turn low grade vegetation into rich milk which, due to its higher percentage of solids, provides higher levels of protein, fat and minerals than cow milk.

Contents for  buffalo milk:
 proteins 3.72–4.2% 
 fat 7.5% 
 vitamin A 0.15 mg
 vitamin B 0.003 mg
 vitamin B1 0.3 mg
 calcium 169 mg 
 phosphorus 380 mg
 sodium 0.4 mg
 iron 0.7 mg
 energy content 270 Kcal/100 g

Uses

Generally, buffalo mozzarella is eaten with calzone, vegetable, salad (for example, insalata Caprese), on pizza (a low moisture content buffalo mozzarella is preferred), on grilled bread, with tomatoes, or by itself accompanied by olive oil.

See also
 List of Italian DOP cheeses
 List of Italian cheeses
 List of stretch-cured cheeses
 List of water buffalo cheeses

References

Further reading

External links

 Mozzarella di Bufala Campana DOP official website
 Mozzarella di Bufala Campana (Italian) - History and detailed technical process definition
 Mozzarella di Bufala Campana (trade association)
 History and photos
 Video: Water Buffalo of Campania Italy

Stretched-curd cheeses
Water buffalo's-milk cheeses
Cheeses with designation of origin protected in the European Union
Italian cheeses
Italian products with protected designation of origin
Cuisine of Campania